Asphalt Princess is a double-hulled tanker used to transport bitumen and asphalt. It is currently operated by Asphalt Princess Shipping. The ship was launched on 19 December 1975 and completed in 1976 by Ankerlokken Glommen of Frederikstad, Norway. Initially named Joasla, the vessel was sold in 1979 and renamed Orinoco, then again in 1981 to Rio Orinoco. As Rio Orinoco, the vessel went aground on Anticosti Island in the Gulf of St. Lawrence in October 1990 and spilled  of oil into the gulf before being freed. The ship was acquired by Groupe Desgagné following this and renamed Thalassa Desgagnes. While in service with Groupe Desgagné, the vessel suffered a fire and ran aground. Asphalt Princess Shipping purchased the ship in 2017.

The hijackers were allegedly backed by Iran. 
Ships nearby in the Gulf of Oman were advised to exercise “extreme caution” by the United Kingdom Maritime Trade Operations (UKMTO) earlier in the day. The boarders left the ship the next day.

Description

The tanker is powered by a  diesel engine turning one shaft.

Construction and career

The tanker was constructed by Ankerlokken Glommen at their yard in Fredrikstad, Norway with the yard number 189. The vessel's keel was laid down in May 1975 and the ship was launched on 19 December 1975. Named Joasla, the tanker was completed on 8 May 1976 and handed over to its owners, I/S Joasla and registered in Oslo, Norway. In 1978, ownership of the vessel was acquired by Bjorn Ruud-Pedersen. In 1979, the vessel was acquired Bengt Anderssons Rev.Byra, registered in Sweden and renamed Orinoco.

In 1981, Horizon Development Corp Ltd purchased the ship, renamed it Rio Orinoco and registered the vessel in Limassol, Cyprus. The 21 crew members aboard attempted to refloat the vessel, but not before  of fuel oil spilled in the waters, though initial reports claimed nothing had spilled. Cleanup operations, coordinated by the Canadian Coast Guard, continued into November due to the remoteness of the island. On 17 October, the owners of the ship appointed salvors to removed the ship. The crew were evacuated and several attempts were made but the ship was not freed, further damaging Rio Orinoco. On 18 November, issuers declared the vessel a total loss and on 21 November, the owners formally abandoned the ship. Following this, the Canadian Coast Guard issued a contract proposal for salvors, deciding on Groupe Desgagné in mid June 1991. Groupe Desgagné was successful in its efforts in freeing the ship on 9 August.

As a salvage reward, the ship was acquired by Groupe Desgagnés and taken to MIL Davie Shipbuilding in Lauzon, Quebec to be rebuilt. The vessel re-entered service in 1993 and made its first voyage as Thalassa Desgagnes in 1994. The vessel remained in Groupe Desgagnés service until 2017, transporting asphalt from Venezuela to ports along the Atlantic coast of North America. On 13 February 2010, while moored in Montreal, welding work sparked a small explosion, and fire. The vessel's holds were empty at the time of the fire, which was quickly extinguished. One person was injured. On 6 January 2014, ice accumulation caused her to run aground on the St. Lawrence River, between Montreal and Trois-Rivières. On 3 July 2015, Groupe Desgagné announced they would be replacing Thalassa Desgagnes with a new vessel, powered by less polluting natural gas-fired engines. In 2017, the vessel was acquired by Asphalt Princess Shipping and renamed Asphalt Princess.

2021 hijacking incident

At 04:44 UTC on 4 August, UKMTO released an update declaring the incident a “potential hijacking”, where a group of eight or nine armed individuals were believed to have boarded the vessel without authorisation and ordered the ship to sail to Iran. At 05:32 UTC on 4 August, the UKMTO reported that the boarders had left the vessel and that the vessel was safe, signifying an end to the incident. At 07:26 UTC on 4 August, Al Jazeera reported on Twitter, that the Iranian Armed Forces claimed to be "providing assistance and security for merchant ships" and were ready to send “relief units” to the vessel.

References

External links
 
 
 

1975 ships
2021 in Oman
Attacks in Asia in 2021
Merchant ships of Canada
Merchant ships of Panama
Tankers
Groupe Desgagnés
Maritime incidents in 2010
Maritime incidents in 2014
Maritime incidents in 2021
Ships built in Fredrikstad
2021 incident
Iran–United States military relations
July 2021 events in Asia